Australia's First Families of Wine (AFFW) is an Australian wine initiative to raise the profile of Australian wine to the world, showcasing a representative of its landmark wines and to highlight the quality and diversity of Australian wine. Established by a collective of twelve multi-generational family-owned wine producers. Together the families represent seventeen wine-growing regions across Australia and forty-eight generations of winemakers. It was officially launched at the Sydney Opera House on 31 August 2009 by Tony Burke, Minister for Agriculture, Fisheries and Forestry.

Members
The inaugural members of Australia's First Families of Wine are:
 Brown Brothers, founded in 1885, with vineyards in the King Valley, Heathcote and Swan Hill wine regions of Victoria
 Campbells of Rutherglen, founded in 1870, with vineyards in the Rutherglen wine region of Victoria
 D'Arenberg, (the Osborn family), founded in 1912, with vineyards in the McLaren Vale wine region of South Australia
 Henschke, founded in 1868, with vineyards in the Eden Valley and Adelaide Hills wine regions of South Australia
 Howard Park Wines, (the Burch family), founded in 1986, with vineyards in the Margaret River and Great Southern wine regions of Western Australia
 Jim Barry Wines, founded in 1959, with vineyards in the Clare Valley and Coonawarra wine regions of South Australia
 McWilliam's Wines, founded in 1877, with vineyards in the Riverina, Hunter Valley and Hilltops wine regions of New South Wales, the Yarra Valley wine region of Victoria, the Coonawarra wine region of South Australia and the Margaret River wine region of Western Australia
 Tahbilk, (the Purbrick family), founded in 1860, with vineyards in the Nagambie Lakes wine region of Victoria
 Taylors Wines, founded in 1969, with vineyards in the Clare Valley wine region of South Australia
 Tyrrell's, founded in 1858, with vineyards in the Hunter Valley wine region of New South Wales, the Heathcote wine region of Victoria and the McLaren Vale wine region and Limestone Coast wine zone of South Australia
 Yalumba, (the Hill Smith family), founded in 1849, with vineyards in the Eden Valley and the Barossa Valley wine regions of South Australia.

Criteria
The main criteria that the family-owned companies need are:
 Have a "landmark wine" in their portfolios listed under Langton's Classification and/or 75% agreement by group that a wine is considered "iconic"
 Being family controlled as defined under the Australian Corporations Act
 Have the ability to do at least a 20-year vertical tasting
 Have a history going back a minimum of two generations
 Have ownership of vineyards more than 50 years old and/or ownership of distinguished sites which exemplify the best of terroir
 Long-term commitment to export, environmental best practices and appropriate cellar door experience
 Family-member service on wine industry bodies
 Membership of the Winemakers Federation of Australia

Mission statement
First Families chairman and fourth generation winemaker and Tahbilk chief executive Alister Purbrick stated: "We desperately need to change the global perception of Australian wine. We don't believe as individual companies we can stem the avalanche of news stories about Australia producing nothing but cheap industrial wines. But together we can present a powerful showcase of terrific regional wines of great diversity." Some industry commentators lay the blame for this negative opinion on the giant, publicly listed multinational corporations, such as Constellation Wines and Foster's, which have dominated the industry for years and concentrated on the cheap commodity end of the market rather than building the reputation of Australia's finer, regionally distinctive wines. "While as family winemakers we all value our independence, we do share a common vision - that Australian wine can take on the world's best and win," Purbrick said.

History of concept
The concept is based on similar initiative launched nearly 20 years ago when a group of the Europe's leading family wineries formed an association called Primum Familiae Vini, (PFV abbreviated often, Latin:  Best families of the wine), and replicated a few years ago in New Zealand with its Family of Twelve.

Books and media
 '' Heart & soul : Australia's First Families of Wine, (2010)

See also
 Australian Wine
 Langton's Classification of Australian Wine

References

Notes

Bibliography

External links
 AFFW Website: Australia's First Families of Wine

Australian cuisine-related lists
Wine-related lists
Australian wine
Wine industry organizations